, also called Legend of Fabulous Battle Windaria and Once Upon a Time, is a Japanese animated film produced by Kaname Productions and Idol. The film was directed by Kunihiko Yuyama in his directorial debut, and written by Keisuke Fujikawa. It was released theatrically in Japan on July 19, 1986.

Plot
The mountainous kingdom of Paro and the coastal city-state of Itha had been at peace for over a century. They would have remained that way but for the ambitions of Paro's power-hungry king. Paro invaded Itha, despite the love between Jill, Paro's prince, and Ahanas, Itha's princess.  Caught between duty and emotion, the star-crossed lovers were forced to fight a war to its bitter conclusion. Meanwhile, Isu was a simple farmer from the neutral village of Saki, but he saved Itha from being destroyed by a spy from Paro, and found himself hungering for wealth and glory that the Ithan monarchy couldn't provide. Agents from Paro made him an offer to fulfill his wishes, and he left his wife Marin behind in what would turn into a battlefield between the two kingdoms.

Voice cast

Production
Windaria is based on a novel of the same name, authored by Keisuke Fujikawa, the film's screenwriter. Fujikawa's resume includes the live-action Ultraman and the animated series Space Battleship Yamato, Grendizer, and Cat's Eye. The film was produced by animation companies Kaname Productions and Idol and directed by Kunihiko Yuyama, who previously worked on Magical Princess Minky Momo and GoShogun. Studio Gallop was responsible for its photography and Studio Cosmos contributed the backgrounds. Mutsumi Inomata acted as both character designer and animation director. The film's instrumental musical score was composed by Satoshi Kadokura. The vocal theme  was written by Kazuhiko Katō and performed by J-pop singer Akino Arai. The ending theme  was written and performed by Arai. Arai stated that she did not discuss the composition of the tracks with the director as she would have later in her career.

Soundtrack

Release and marketing
Windaria was released theatrically in Japan on July 19, 1986. In 1987, Harmony Gold licensed Windaria for release in the United States, trimming the film from its original 101-minute running time to 95 minutes.  The English-language version was edited in order to better market the film to younger audiences. According to director Carl Macek, Harmony Gold was given no scripts or translations of the property and they thus had little insight into the plot details. The English version included a new script, an altered plot with a happy ending, scenes switched around, violent and adult-oriented scenes removed, the entire cast given Western names, and added narration provided by Russell Johnson (of Gilligan's Island fame).

Windaria was first distributed in Japan to home video by Victor Entertainment. The eventual laserdisc release contained a trailer, a pilot film (in which characters are colored differently than the final version), and a second audio track. Victor released Windaria on DVD in Japan on December 16, 2000. This release forgoes the laserdisc extras but includes a director interview on the insert. Atlus reissued the film on DVD on March 25, 2005. Streamline Pictures released the English version, titled Windaria, on North American VHS between 1992 and 1993. A laserdisc version was planned by Image Entertainment yet never distributed. ADV Films re-released the English version, as Once Upon a Time, on DVD on March 23, 2004. The uncut Japanese version has never been officially released in this region.

A generous amount of Windaria-related merchandise has been marketed in Japan since the film's 1986 debut. Fujikawa's Douwa Meita Senshi Windaria bunkobon was published by Kadokawa Shoten during March 1986. Shortly after the premiere of Windaria, several official guide books were released, one (Settei: Windaria) containing Idol's sketches, storyboards, and promotional materials. A special omake was published on August 25, 1986, as part of Kadokawa's "Mediamix Special" imprint. Inomata's 1988 art book Gatsu no Koe Hoshi no Yume contains some of her illustrations from the film. Arai's album Natsukashii Mirai, containing both the film's opening and ending themes, was released by Victor on October 21, 1986. Arai later re-recorded "Utsukushii Hoshi" for her 2005 album Sora no Uta due to her dissatisfaction with the first version of the song. The film's original soundtrack was released by Victor on both LP and CD on July 21, 1986, and CD was reprinted on March 24, 1994. It was reissued on June 23, 1999 alongside the soundtrack to Birth, another anime by Kaname. Finally, a 2008 Nintendo DS video game based on the film was developed by Compile Heart under the name  and released in Japan.

Reception

Critical reception for the original Japanese version of Windaria has been favorable. Ralph Jenkins of Mania.com called the film "the quintessential anime tragedy". The reviewer elaborated: "The overriding theme of this grim allegory is that a promise—especially between lovers—is something so sacred that it thrives even beyond death, and taking it for granted can beget devastating consequences". Jenkins noted both Inomata's character designs and the film's musical score to be memorable.

See also
Castle in the Sky, another 1986 anime film with a large tree central to the story.

References

External links

Official Dungeon of Windaria website 

1986 anime films
Action anime and manga
Drama anime and manga
Fantasy anime and manga
Films based on Japanese novels
Films directed by Kunihiko Yuyama
Japanese animated films
ADV Films